Solariella obscura, common name the obscure solarelle, is a species of sea snail, a marine gastropod mollusk in the family Solariellidae.

Distribution
This marine species occurs circum-Arctic, in the Northern Pacific Ocean and in the Northern Atlantic Ocean

Description 
The maximum recorded shell length is 8.9 mm.

The thin, umbilicate shell has a conical shape. It is ashen, whitish or reddish in color. The surface is lusterless, the dull outer layer very thin, overlying a brilliantly iridescent nacre. The sculpture consists of a rather prominent spiral ridge or carina at the shoulder of each whorl, beneath which, on the peripheral portion of the whorl, there are several (generally 3 to 6) smaller lirae, often subobsolete. The entire base sometimes shows fine low concentric lirae, but usually they nearly disappear there, becoming visible again around the umbilicus. There are often traces of a few obscure spiral riblets above the supra-peripheral carina. Longitudinally the entire surface is marked by regular. rather close waves or folds, so low and obtuse as to be frequently almost indistinguishable. The spire is conical. The apex is rather blunt. The apical whorl is rather prominent, reddish, corneous or purplish, smooth and rounded. The suture is impressed. The 5½ whorls are convex and tubular.  The body whorl is slightly convex beneath and carinated around the umbilicus. The aperture is oblique, and circular. Its margins are thin and arcuate. There is a slight angle at the base of the columellar lip.

Habitat 
Minimum recorded depth is 5 m. Maximum recorded depth is 878 m.

References

 Gofas, S.; Le Renard, J.; Bouchet, P. (2001). Mollusca, in: Costello, M.J. et al. (Ed.) (2001). European register of marine species: a check-list of the marine species in Europe and a bibliography of guides to their identification. Collection Patrimoines Naturels, 50: pp. 180–213

External links
 

obscura
Gastropods described in 1838